Riley Brett (11 June 1895 McAlester, Oklahoma – 5 February 1982 Los Angeles, California) was an American racecar driver.

Indy 500 results

References
Rick Popely with L. Spencer Riggs, The Indianapolis 500 Chronicle

Indianapolis 500 drivers
1895 births
1982 deaths
People from McAlester, Oklahoma
Racing drivers from Oklahoma